Orange România is a broadband Internet service provider and mobile provider in Romania. It is Romania's largest GSM network operator which is majority owned by Orange S.A., the biggest initial investor, who gradually increased its ownership.

Between 1997 and April 2002, the company was named Mobil Rom, operated under two brand names Dialog (for monthly subscription plans, in Romanian means "dialogue") and Alo (for prepay services). In April 2002, after France Télécom gained a majority stake it was re-branded to comply with the group's global strategy. As of December 2012, Orange Romania has 10.3 million mobile subscribers.

Orange is in head-to-head competition with Vodafone Romania for one of the most dynamic mobile telephony markets in south eastern Europe. Currently the mobile penetration is at about 115% (active users only). Orange edged ahead of Vodafone (formerly Connex) in terms of number of subscribers in September 2004. They are the main mobile telephony operators, with Orange having a market share of almost 38% of the total market (active and inactive users).

Orange România also controls 4% of the Moldovan operator Orange Moldova.

Radio frequency summary

The following is a list of known frequencies which Orange uses in Romania:

See also

 List of mobile network operators
 Communications media in Romania
 Orange Moldova

References

External links
 
 Orange Moldova

Companies based in Bucharest
Mobile phone companies of Romania
Romania